A list of films produced in Argentina in 1972:

External links and references
 Argentine films of 1972 at the Internet Movie Database

1972
Lists of 1972 films by country or language
Films